Tennis is an unincorporated community in Finney County, Kansas, United States.

References

Further reading

External links
 Finney County maps: Current, Historic, KDOT

Unincorporated communities in Finney County, Kansas
Unincorporated communities in Kansas